Denis Khlystov (born July 4, 1979) is a Russian former professional ice hockey centre who played in the Kontinental Hockey League (KHL).

References

External links

1979 births
Living people
Ak Bars Kazan players
Metallurg Magnitogorsk players
HC Neftekhimik Nizhnekamsk players
Salavat Yulaev Ufa players
HC Yugra players
Russian ice hockey centres
Sportspeople from Ufa